Satyapal Singh was a former minister of state in Government of India. He was minister in the Atal Bihari Vajpayee government from 1998 to 1999 and held the portfolio of food and consumer affairs. He was elected as MLA 5 times from Tilhar constituency, 3 times to Lok Sabha from Shahjahanpur in Uttar Pradesh. He has 3 children (2 sons Rajesh Yadav and Amit Yadav aka Rinku and 1 daughter Shashi Prabha).

He was born in 1942 at village Siura  and passed MA and LLM from Lucknow University. He entered politics soon after studies and was elected to Uttar Pradesh Legislative Assembly in 1974 from the seat of Tilhar. He was elected as Leader of Opposition in The Uttar Pradesh Legislative Assembly.

He changed political parties at will and was a member of Bharatiya Janata Party, Samajwadi Party, Janata Dal. His mentor was Chaudhari Charan Singh and later Chaudhari Ajit Singh.

He died on 23 July 2004. His sons entered politics after his death. His son is former MLA from Tilhar on a Samajwadi Party ticket and a current MLA from Katra.

Rajesh Yadav won MLA election in 2012 from Katra Constituency of Shahjahanpur District and Amit Yadav aka Rinku won MLC elections from Pilibhit Shahjahanpur.

Early and personal life 
He was born in village Siura, district Shahjahanpur, Uttar Pradesh.

Biography 

Father's Name:       	Shri Chet Ram Singh Yadav

Date of Birth:       	1 July 1942

Marital Status:      	Married on 25 May 1964

Spouse's Name:       	Smt. Shakuntla Yadav

Children:            	Two sons and  one daughter

Educational Qualifications

M.A., LL.M.

Educated at Lucknow University, Lucknow (Uttar Pradesh)

Profession

Agriculturist, Lawyer, Political and Social Worker

Positions Held

1974-89:		Member, Uttar Pradesh Legislative Assembly

1977-80:		Member, Public Accounts Committee

1981-84:     Member, Committee on Public Undertakings

1987-89:     Leader of Opposition, Uttar Pradesh Legislative Assembly

1989:        Elected to 9th Lok Sabha

1990:        Member, Advisory Committee on Environment, and Railway Committee

Member, Consultative Committee, Ministry of Communications

1991:        Re-elected to 10th Lok Sabha (2nd term)

		    Member, Committee on Petitions

		    Member, Consultative Committee, Ministry of Communications

1998:        Re-elected to 12th Lok Sabha (3rd term)

19 March 1998 onwards:   Union Minister of State, Food and Consumer Affairs

Social and Cultural Activities

Opening of schools in rural and backward areas; helping
victims of flood, fire, natural calamities and atrocities
committed by the police

Favourite Pastimes and Recreation

Reading, horticulture, music, travelling and meeting the
people

Sports and Clubs

Yoga and walking

Other Information

Member, Lok Dal, 1980-90

External links 
 
 

People from Shahjahanpur
Bharatiya Janata Party politicians from Uttar Pradesh
University of Lucknow alumni
1942 births
Living people
Leaders of the Opposition in the Uttar Pradesh Legislative Assembly
Indian National Congress politicians
Samajwadi Party politicians
Janata Dal politicians
People from Shahjahanpur district
India MPs 1989–1991
India MPs 1991–1996
India MPs 1998–1999
Lok Sabha members from Uttar Pradesh